Platylabia is a genus of earwigs, the sole member of the subfamily Platylabiinae. It was cited by Srivastava in Part 2 of Fauna of India. It was also cited at an earlier date by Steinmann in his publication, The Animal Kingdom in 1986, 1989, 1990, and 1993, and by Chen & Ma in Fauna Sinica in 2004.

References

External links 
 The Earwig Research Centre's Platylabia database Source for references: type Platylabia in the "genus" field and click "search".

Anisolabididae